Coloman Braun-Bogdan (13 October 1905 – 15 March 1983) was a Romanian football midfielder and football manager.

Born in Arad, Arad County, which was at the time part of Austria-Hungary, he made a name for himself as one of the best Romanian midfielders of the interwar period. One of his most important achievements was being part of the Romania squad at the 1938 World Cup.

His coaching career started early while he was still an active player. In 1933 he took the coaching courses of the British football school at Folkestone and in 1940 those of the Romanian football school of O.N.E.F. As manager he led Sportul Studenţesc and Jiul Petroşani to the top flight of Romanian football and he won the Romanian national championship and the Romanian Cup with UTA Arad.

He was also the first manager in the history of Steaua București and Dinamo Bucharest.

After retiring from coaching, he had an active role in the Romanian Football Federation. He wrote two books on football :Fotbalul în glumă ("Football as a Joke") and Din lumea balonului rotund ("From the World of the Round Ball").

Honours
Manager

UTA Arad
Romanian League: 1
1954
Romanian Cup: 1
1953

References

1905 births
1983 deaths
Sportspeople from Arad, Romania
1938 FIFA World Cup players
Association football midfielders
Romanian Austro-Hungarians
Romanian footballers
Vagonul Arad players
FC Petrolul Ploiești players
Liga I players
Romanian football managers
FC Sportul Studențesc București managers
CSM Jiul Petroșani managers
FC Rapid București managers
FC Steaua București managers
FC Dinamo București managers
FC UTA Arad managers
FC Politehnica Timișoara managers
Romania national football team managers
Romanian expatriate footballers
Expatriate footballers in France
Romanian expatriate sportspeople in France